This is a list of career achievements by Wayne Gretzky in the National Hockey League (NHL). Upon his retirement on 18 April 1999, Gretzky held or shared 61 NHL records. Those records included 40 regular season, 15 playoff and 6 All-Star records.

Winning 4 Stanley Cups, Gretzky set records in both regular season and post-season play, holding the record for most career regular season goals (894), assists (1,963), points (2,857) and hat-tricks (50). The next closest player in total points for the regular season is Jaromir Jagr at 1,921, thus Gretzky had more career assists than any other player has total points. Gretzky scored his first 1,000 points faster (424 games) than any other player in NHL history, and scored a second 1,000 points (point number 1,001 through 2,000) faster (433 games) than any player other than himself. Gretzky's point total including regular season and playoffs stands at an imposing 3,239 (1,016 goals, 2,223 assists).

His 47 playoff points in 1985 and 31 assists in 1988 are still records for a single post-season round, and he holds the record for career playoff goals (122), assists (260), points (382), hat-tricks (10) and game-winning goals (24).

Below is a list of official records Gretzky held or shared at the time of his retirement.

Regular season records (40)
 Most goals: 894 in 1,487 games
 Most goals, including playoffs: 1,016 in 1,487 regular season games including 122 playoff goals
 Most goals, one season: 92 in 1981–82, 80-game schedule
 Most goals, one season, including playoffs: 100 in 1983–84, 87 goals in 74 regular season games and 13 goals in 19 playoff games
 Most goals, 50 games from start of season: 61 in 1981–82 (7 October 1981 to 22 January 1982, 80-game schedule) and 1983–84 (5 October 1983 to 25 January 1984), 80-game schedule
 Most goals, one period: 4 (tied with 10 other players) 18 February 1981
 Most assists: 1,963
 Most assists, including playoffs: 2,223
 Most assists, one season: 163 in 1985–86, 80-game schedule
 Most assists, one season, including playoffs: 174 in 1985–86, 163 assists in 80 regular season games and 11 assists in 10 playoff games
 Most assists, one game: 7  (tied with Billy "The Kid" Taylor) on three occasions—16 February 1980; 11 December 1985; 15 February 1986
 Most assists, one road game: 7 (tied with Billy "The Kid" Taylor)  11 December 1985
 Most points: 2,857 in 1,487 games (894 goals, 1,963 assists)
 Most points, including playoffs: 3,239 in 1,487 regular season and 208 playoff games. (1016 goals, 2223 assists)
 Most points, one season: 215 in 1985–86, 80-game schedule (52 goals, 163 assists)
 Most points, one season, including playoffs: 255 in 1984–85; 208 points in 80 regular season games and 47 points in 18 playoff games
 Most overtime assists, career: 15
 Most goals by a centre, career: 894
 Most goals by a centre, one season: 92 in 1981–82, 80-game schedule
 Most assists by a centre, career: 1,963
 Most assists by a centre, one season: 163 in 1985–86, 80-game schedule
 Most points by a centre, career: 2,857
 Most points by a centre, one season: 215 in 1985–86, 80-game schedule
 Most assists in one game by a player in his first season: 7 on 15 February 1980
 Highest goals-per-game average, one season: 1.18 in 1983–84, 87 goals in 74 games
 Highest assists-per-game average, career (300 min.): 1.321 -- 1,963 assists in 1,487 games
 Highest assists-per-game average, one season: 2.04 in 1985–86, 163 assists in 80 games
 Highest points-per-game average, one season (among players with 50-or-more points): 2.77 in 1983–84, 205 points in 74 games
 Most 40-or-more goal seasons: 12 in 20 seasons
 Most consecutive 40-or-more goal seasons: 12 from 1979–80 to 1990–91
 Most 50-or-more goal seasons: 9 (tied with Mike Bossy and Alex Ovechkin)
 Most 60-or-more goal seasons: 5 (tied with Mike Bossy)
 Most consecutive 60-or-more goals seasons: 4 from 1981–82 to 1984–85
 Most 100-or-more point seasons: 15
 Most consecutive 100-or-more point seasons: 13 from 1979–80 to 1991–92
 Most three-or-more goal games, career: 50 -- 37 three-goal (hat trick) games; nine four-goal games; four five-goal games
 Most three goal games, one season: 10 (done twice) in 1981–82 and 1983–84
 Longest consecutive assist scoring streak: 23 games in 1990–91, 48 assists
 Longest consecutive point-scoring streak: 51 Games in 1983–84 (October 5, 1983 to January 28, 1984, 61 goals, 92 assists for 153 points)
 Longest consecutive point-scoring streak from start of season: 51 in 1983–84; 61 goals, 92 assists for 153 points (October 5, 1983 to January 28, 1984)

Playoff records (15)

 Most playoff goals, career: 122
 Most playoff assists, career: 260
 Most assists, one playoff year: 31 in 1988 (19 games)
 Most assists in one series: 14 (tied with Rick Middleton) in 1985 Conference Finals (six games vs. Chicago)
 Most assists in final series: 10 in 1988 (four games, plus suspended game vs. Boston)
 Most assists, one playoff game: 6 (tied with Mikko Leinonen) on 9 April 1987
 Most assists, one playoff period: 3 -- Three assists by one player in one period of a playoff game has been recorded on 70 occasions, five of them by Gretzky
 Most points, career: 382 -- 122 goals and 260 assists
 Most points, one playoff year: 47 in 1985 (17 goals and 30 assists in 18 games)
 Most points in final series: 13 in 1988 three goals and 10 assists (four games plus suspended game vs. Boston, three goals)
 Most points, one playoff period: 4 (tied with nine other players)
 Most short-handed goals, one playoff year: 3 (tied with five other players) 1983
 Most short-handed goals, one playoff game: 2 (tied with eight other players) 6 April 1983
 Most game-winning goals in playoffs, career: 24 (tied with Brett Hull)
 Most three-or-more goals games (hat trick): 10 (eight three-goal games, two four-goal games)

All-Star records (6)

 Most All-Star game goals, career: 13 (in 18 games played)
 Most All-Star game goals, one game: 4 (tied with three players) 1983 Campbell Conference
 Most All-Star game goals, one period: 4 1983 Campbell Conference, third period
 Most All-Star game assists, career: 12 (tied with four others)
 Most All-Star game points, career: 25 (13 goals, 12 assists in 18 games)
 Most All-Star game points, one period: 4 (tied with Mike Gartner and Adam Oates) 1983 Campbell Conference, third period (four goals)

Records update
Since Wayne Gretzky's retirement, three of his records have fallen and he has gained one record, leaving him with a new total of 59 official records.

Broken records
 Gretzky's record of 15 regular season overtime assists has now been passed by three players. They are Nicklas Lidstrom (16), Adam Oates (17), and Mark Messier (18).
 Joe Sakic (16), Mark Messier (14), and Ray Bourque (13)  have passed Gretzky's record (12) for most All-Star game assists.
 In the second round of the 2022 Stanley Cup playoffs, Leon Draisaitl recorded 15 assists to break Gretzky's record of 14.

New records
 Wayne Gretzky finished his career with a 1.921 points per game average. Mario Lemieux originally held the record with 2.005 points per game when Gretzky retired, but after Lemieux came back to the NHL from 2000 to 2005, his points per game average fell to 1.883, falling to second behind Gretzky.

Unofficial records
Along with his numerous official records, Wayne Gretzky also has many "unofficial" records. These other records - though not recognized by the NHL Official Guide and Record Book - are still significant records.

NHL scoring records
 Youngest player to score 50 goals in a season (19 years, two months)
 Most points by an NHL player in his first year: 137. Because of Gretzky's season played in the WHA, he was not considered a rookie in his first year, so the rookie record belongs to Teemu Selanne with 132
 Most assists by an NHL player in his first year: 86. The rookie record is held jointly by Peter Stastny and Joe Juneau with 70 assists.  Note that the record book gives Gretzky the record for most assists and points in a game as a first year player, but not the season totals
 Most 200-or-more point seasons: 4. Gretzky owns the official record for most 100 point seasons. He is the only player to reach 200 points in a season
 Most consecutive 200 point seasons: 3
 Most 70-or-more goal seasons: 4. The NHL has a record for most 60 goal seasons, but not 70. Eight players have achieved 70 goals, and Brett Hull did so three times.
 Most consecutive 70 goal seasons: 4
 Most 80-or-more goal seasons: 2
 Most 90-or-more goal seasons: 1. Gretzky is the only player to achieve this
 Fastest 50 goals from start of season: 50 goals in 39 games. The mark of 50 goals in 50 games is a rare event, achieved by only five players. The quickest, 50 goals in 39 games, is often labelled as the most difficult one to break of all of Gretzky's records. The NHL has an official record for the most goals in first 50 games, but not the fastest 50 goals
 Fastest 100 points: 34 games in 1983–84
 Most seasons averaging at least 1 point per game: 19
 Most consecutive seasons averaging at least 1 point per game: 19
 Most seasons averaging at least 2 points per game: 10
 Most consecutive seasons averaging at least 2 points per game: 9
 Most game-winning goals in the playoffs: 24 (tied with Brett Hull)
 Most game-winning assists in one season: 23
 Most game-winning assists in regular season career: 234
 Most game-winning points in regular season career: 325
 Highest career game-winning points per game average: 0.2185
 Most 100-or-more assist seasons: 11
 Most consecutive 100-or-more assist seasons: 11
 Most seasons leading in even strength goals: 4
 Most career even strength goals: 617
 Most seasons leading in short-handed goals: 5
 Most seasons leading in assists: 16
 Most seasons leading in points: 11
 Most seasons leading in both goals and assists: 5 (this was only achieved 7 other times in history, with Gordie Howe (2) and Mario Lemieux (2) accounting for 4 of those other occurrences).
 Most seasons leading the league in goals, assists and plus/minus: 4 (no other player has done this, although plus/minus was only counted since 1967).
 Most seasons leading in goals created: 7
 Most seasons leading in assists per game: 12
 Most seasons leading in points per game: 11
 Most seasons leading in total goals on-ice for: 8
 Most short-handed regular season career goals: 73
 Most short-handed goals career (regular season & playoffs) : 85
 Most 10+ shorthanded goals in a season : 2
 Most shorthanded assists career (regular season) : 76
 Most shorthanded assists career (playoffs) : 13
 Most shorthanded assists career (regular season & playoffs) : 89
 Most shorthanded points career (regular season) : 149
 Most shorthanded points career (playoffs) : 24
 Most shorthanded points career (regular season & playoffs) : 173
 Most scoring championships (Art Ross Trophy): 10
 Largest margin of victory in the scoring race: 79 (in 1983–84)
 Most seasons where he was his team's leading scorer: 19
 Highest plus/minus in a single playoff year: +28 (1984–85)
 Highest plus/minus by a forward, single season: +100
 Highest plus/minus by a forward, career: +520
 Highest plus/minus by a centre in playoff career: +67
 Most MVP awards (Hart Memorial Trophy): 9
 Most trophies in career: 31
 Former mark as youngest player to score three or more goals in an All-Star Game was passed by Dany Heatley in 2003.
 Most official NHL records: 61 on retirement, 60 at present (19 years after his last game)

Major league scoring records
 Most NHL and WHA regular season assists: 2,027 – Gretzky's 1,384th career assist occurred on November 2, 1990, in Washington's 4–3 win over the Kings, breaking the record held by Gordie Howe.
 Most NHL and WHA regular season points: 2,967 – Gretzky broke the record held by Gordie Howe on March 9, 1992, with an assist on a first period goal by Tony Granato to make the game score Los Angeles 2, Toronto 0 (final was 4–1). It was his 2,359th career point on 1,567 assists and 792 goals.
 Most NHL and WHA goals, regular season (940) and playoff (132): 1,072 (one more than Gordie Howe), with Gretzky's final goal on March 29, 1999, being the game-winner with 2:07 remaining in the Rangers' 3–1 win over the New York Islanders
 Most NHL and WHA regular season and playoff assists: 2,297
 Most NHL and WHA regular season and playoff points: 3,369

Milestone records 

The following are NHL milestone records:
 Only player to reach 2,000 career points
 Only player to reach 3,000 career points, regular season and playoffs combined
 Only player to reach 1,000 career goals, regular season and playoffs combined
 Only player to reach 2,000 career assists, regular season and playoffs combined

Goals 
 Youngest 100 Goals (20 years, 40 days) (March 15, 1981)
 Fastest and youngest 200 goals (242 games)- modern record, Cy Denneny scored 200 goals in 181 games, (21 years, 256 days) (October 9, 1982)
 Fastest and youngest 300 goals (350 games), (22 years, 321 days) (December 13, 1983)
 Fastest and youngest 400 goals (436 games), (23 years, 352 days) (January 13, 1985)
 Fastest and youngest 500 goals (575 games), (25 years, 299 days) (November 22, 1986)
 Fastest and youngest 600 goals (718 games, one fewer than Mario Lemieux), (27 years, 302 days)(November 23, 1988)
 Fastest and youngest 700 goals (886 games), (29 years, 342 days) (January 3, 1991)
 Fastest and youngest 800 goals (1116 games), (33 years, 53 days) (March 20, 1994)

Assists
 Fastest 100 Assists (92 games) (November 7, 1980)
 Fastest and youngest 200 assists (165 games), (20 years 264 days) (October 18, 1981)
 Fastest and youngest 300 assists (229 games), (21 years 43 days) (March 13, 1982)
 Fastest and youngest 400 assists (290 games), (21 years 362 days) (January 23, 1983)
 Fastest and youngest 500 assists (352 games), (22 years 325 days) (December 17, 1983)
 Fastest and youngest 600 assists (416 games), (23 years 307 days) (November 29, 1984)
 Fastest and youngest 700 assists (478 games), (24 years 267 days) (October 20, 1985)
 Fastest and youngest 800 assists (527 games), (25 years 11 days) (February 8, 1986)
 Fastest and youngest 900 assists (584 games), (25 years 320 days) (December 12, 1986)
 Fastest and youngest 1,000 assists (645 games), (26 years 282 days) (November 4, 1987)
 Fastest and youngest 1,100 assists (706 games), (27 years 276 days) (October 28, 1988)
 Fastest and youngest 1,200 assists (774 games), (28 years 65 days) (April 1, 1989)
 Fastest, youngest, and only 1,300 assists (846 games), (29 years 50 days) (March 17, 1990)

Points
 Fastest 200 Points (117 games)
 Fastest and youngest 300 points (159 games), (20 years, 67 days)
 Fastest and youngest 400 points (197 games), (20 years, 335 days)
 Fastest and youngest 500 points (234 games), (21 years, 52 days)
 Fastest and youngest 600 points (274 games), (21 years, 330 days)
 Fastest and youngest 700 points (317 games), (22 years, 62 days)
 Fastest and youngest 800 points (352 games), (22 years, 325 days)
 Fastest and youngest 900 points (385 games), (23 years, 47 days)
 Fastest and youngest 1,000 points (424 games), (23 years, 328 days)
 Fastest and youngest 1,100 points (464 games), (24 years, 50 days)
 Fastest and youngest 1,200 points (504 games), (24 years, 321 days)
 Fastest and youngest 1,300 points (539 games), (25 years, 38 days)
 Fastest and youngest 1,400 points (580 games), (25 years, 313 days)
 Fastest and youngest 1,500 points (620 games), (26 years, 44 days)
 Fastest and youngest 1,600 points (667 games), (26 years, 330 days)
 Fastest and youngest 1,700 points (711 games), (27 years, 285 days)
 Fastest and youngest 1,800 points (754 games), (28 years, 23 days)
 Fastest and youngest 1,900 points (803 games), (28 years, 318 days)
 Fastest, youngest, and only 2,000 points (857 games), (29 years, 273 days)

Career statistics
Bold denotes career high

* denotes seasons in which Gretzky won the Stanley Cup

Source:

Awards

He won nine Hart Trophies, the NHL's most valuable player award, and eight of these were awarded in consecutive years from 1980 to 1987. Gretzky holds the record for most MVP awards of any player in North American professional sports.
 Lou Kaplan Trophy (WHA rookie of the year) — 1979
 Hart Memorial Trophy (most valuable player) — 1980–87, 1989
 Art Ross Trophy (scoring champion) — 1981–87, 1990, 1991, 1994
 Charlie Conacher Humanitarian Award — 1980
 Conn Smythe Trophy (playoff most valuable player) — 1985, 1988
 Lester B. Pearson Award (outstanding player, voted by the players) — 1982–85, 1987
 Lady Byng Memorial Trophy (sportsmanship) — 1980, 1991, 1992, 1994, 1999
 NHL Plus-Minus Award (best plus-minus rating; formerly Emery Edge Trophy) — 1984, 1985, 1987 (league leader in 1982 no award)
 Stanley Cup — 1984, 1985, 1987, 1988
 Canada Cup — 1984, 1987, 1991
 Chrysler-Dodge/NHL Performer of the Year — 1985, 1986, 1987
Dodge/NHL Performance of the Year Trophy — 1989
 Lester Patrick Trophy (outstanding service to hockey in the United States) — 1994
 Lou Marsh Trophy (Canadian athlete of the year) — 1982, 1983, 1985, 1989
 Lionel Conacher Award (Canadian male athlete of the year) — 1980, 1981, 1982, 1983, 1985, 1989, 1999
 NHL All-Star Game MVP — 1983, 1989, 1999
 NHL MVP — Rendez-vous '87
 Sports Illustrated Sportsman of the Year — 1982
 Associated Press Male Athlete of the Year — 1982
 New York Rangers MVP — 1997-98
 Olympic Gold - Hockey (as Executive Director-Manager) — 2002
 World Cup of Hockey Champion (as Executive Director-Manager) — 2004

Honours
 8-Time All-NHL First Team (1981–87, 1991)
 7-Time All-NHL Second Team (1980, 1988–90, 1994, 1997, 1998)
 All-WHA Second Team — 1979
 In 1998, he was ranked number 1 on The Hockey News''' list of the 100 Greatest Hockey Players
 Hockey Hall of Fame 1999 Inductee (Three year waiting period post retirement waived)
 Edmonton Oilers Hall of Fame 2022 Inductee
 Officer of the Order of Canada
 First international recipient of the Horatio Alger Award
 Received star on Canada's Walk of Fame
 AP-Athlete Of The Decade, 1980s
 Ranked No. 1 Canadian Athlete of the Century
 Sports Illustrated's Hockey Player of the Century
 Ranked No. 5 in both ESPN SportsCentury's and the Associated Press's Top 100 Athletes of the 20th Century Behind Muhammad Ali, Michael Jordan, Babe Ruth, Jim Brown (ESPN) and Jim Thorpe (AP)
 In 2007, he was ranked number 1 in The Hockey News' book The Top 60 Since 1967''
 In 2010, he was elected as an inaugural inductee into the World Hockey Association Hall of Fame in the "Legends of the Game" category.
 IIHF Centennial All-Star Team
 Jersey number 99 retired league-wide by NHL
 IIHF All-Time Canada Team

See also 
 50 goals in 50 games
 List of NHL statistical leaders
 List of NHL seasons
 List of NHL players with 1,000 points
 List of NHL players with 500 goals

References

Further reading

External links
 Video: Gretzky's 50th goal in his 39th game
 Video: Gretzky breaks Phil Esposito's single season goal record
 Video: Gretzky becomes NHL all-time points leader
 Fastest 500 Goal Scorers
 geocities mickmorley
 proicehockey
 Hockey Reference
 Wikipedia talk:Articles for creation NHL_Records_Prior_to_Wayne_Gretzky#Regular_season_records_.2840.29

National Hockey League lists
National Hockey League statistical records
List of career achievements by